Star Theatre (also known as Demolishing and Building Up the Star Theatre) is a 1901 short documentary film in which time-lapse photography is used to show the dismantling and demolition of New York City's Star Theatre over a period of about a month.

Produced by the American Mutoscope and Biograph Company (often shortened to Biograph), it was filmed by F.S. Armitage.  In 2002, the film was deemed "culturally, historically, or aesthetically significant" by the United States Library of Congress, and selected for preservation in its National Film Registry.

Production 
Formerly called Wallack's Theatre, the Star Theatre was located across the street from Biograph's offices on Thirteenth Street and Broadway in New York City, New York. Taking advantage of his view from his office, Armitage set up a camera and used "a specifically devised electric apparatus" to shoot every four minutes, eight hours a day. He also shot about thirty seconds of standard exposures at the beginning and end of the demolition process to set and close the scene.

Biograph publicists encouraged exhibitors to show the film advancing regularly and in reverse, adding "The effect is very extraordinary."

References

External links
 
 
 Star Theatre, Library of Congress
 Demolishing and Building Up the Star Theatre essay by Daniel Eagan in America's Film Legacy: The Authoritative Guide to the Landmark Movies in the National Film Registry, A&C Black, 2010 , pages 9–10 

1901 films
United States National Film Registry films
American black-and-white films
American short documentary films
American silent short films
Documentary films about New York City
1900s short documentary films
Black-and-white documentary films
1901 short films
1900s American films